Dragan Andrić (born 14 September 1989) is a Serbian professional footballer who currently plays for 2. Liga club 1. FC Tatran Prešov as a forward.

Club career

MFK Tatran Liptovský Mikuláš
Andrić made his professional Fortuna Liga debut for MFK Tatran Liptovský Mikuláš in a home fixture against Slovan Bratislava on 24 July 2021, coming on as an added time replacement for Adrián Káčerík.

References

External links
 MFK Tatran Liptovský Mikuláš official club profile
 
 Futbalnet profile
 

1989 births
Living people
Serbian footballers
Association football forwards
Partizán Bardejov players
MFK Tatran Liptovský Mikuláš players
FK Poprad players
1. FC Tatran Prešov players
2. Liga (Slovakia) players
Slovak Super Liga players
Serbian expatriate footballers
Expatriate footballers in Slovakia
Expatriate footballers in Austria
Serbian expatriate sportspeople in Slovakia
Serbian expatriate sportspeople in Austria